HAT-P-65 is a faint star located in the equatorial constellation Equuleus. With an apparent magnitude of 13.16, it requires a telescope to be seen.

Properties 
HAT-P-65 has a similar spectral type to that of the Sun. However, it is 21% more massive, and 86% larger than the latter. HAT-P-65 is slightly hotter, with an effective temperature of 5,916 K compared to 5,778 K of the Sun. It also has a higher luminosity and metallicity, with an iron content 26% greater than the Sun.

Planetary system 
In 2016, an inflated hot Jupiter was discovered orbiting the star in a tight 2 day orbit. As of 2019, the planet has been suffering orbital decay due to its proximity.

References 

G-type subgiants
Planetary systems with one confirmed planet
Equuleus